Below is a list of the presidents and rectors of Central European University in Vienna, Austria and Budapest, Hungary.

Presidents and rectors

References